Sayouba Mandé (born 15 June 1993) is an Ivorian professional footballer who plays as a goalkeeper for FC Helsingør, on loan from Danish Superliga team OB.

Club career
Mandé joined Stabæk in late March 2012 from the same Ivorian academy as Franck Boli, originally on loan until 31 July 2012. He played the first two games of the 2012 Norwegian Football Cup, and made his league debut on 20 May 2012 against FK Haugesund.

International career
Mandé made his international debut for Ivory Coast in a friendly match against Belgium on 5 March 2014, and was later called up to the 2014 World Cup squad.

Career statistics

Club

International

Honours
Ivory Coast
 Africa Cup of Nations: 2015

References

1993 births
Living people
Ivorian footballers
Ivorian expatriate footballers
Association football goalkeepers
Stabæk Fotball players
Odense Boldklub players
FC Helsingør players
Eliteserien players
Footballers from Abidjan
2014 FIFA World Cup players
2015 Africa Cup of Nations players
2017 Africa Cup of Nations players
Ivory Coast international footballers
Africa Cup of Nations-winning players
Norwegian First Division players
Ivorian expatriate sportspeople in Norway
Ivorian expatriate sportspeople in Denmark
Expatriate footballers in Norway
Expatriate men's footballers in Denmark